Robert Earl Schacht (born January 24, 1950) is an American stock car racing driver. Now retired, he is a native of Lombard, Illinois. He competed in 26 NASCAR events between 1981 and 1997 in the Winston Cup, Busch Series, and Craftsman Truck Series. He had no Top 10 finishes in NASCAR; he is best known for his ARCA career. After his retirement as a driver in ARCA following the 2016 season, he continued to field his No. 75 car for other drivers.

He married Patty Simko, a fellow racing driver.

Motorsports career results

NASCAR
(key) (Bold − Pole position awarded by qualifying time. Italics − Pole position earned by points standings or practice time. * – Most laps led.)

Winston Cup Series

Daytona 500

Busch Series

Craftsman Truck Series

ARCA Racing Series
(key) (Bold – Pole position awarded by qualifying time. Italics – Pole position earned by points standings or practice time. * – Most laps led.)

References

External links
 

Living people
1950 births
People from Lombard, Illinois
Racing drivers from Chicago
Racing drivers from Illinois
NASCAR drivers
ARCA Menards Series drivers
American Speed Association drivers
CARS Tour drivers